Gabriel Forest Khouth (November 22, 1972 – July 23, 2019) was a Canadian voice and television actor who worked for Ocean Studios in Vancouver, British Columbia.

Career
Khouth had played several roles in anime, most notably Nicol Amalfi in Gundam SEED. Khouth also acted in the live-action punk/cult film Terminal City Ricochet. Later on, he guest-starred as Hector on MacGyver, and then moved on to Stephen King's 1990 mini-series It, taking the role of Victor Criss. He appeared as Rodney in Ernest Goes to School. His latest film is Santa Baby, in which he played Skip the Elf. He played Spinner Cortez on Hot Wheels Battle Force 5. He also played Sneezy/Mr. Clark in ABC's Once Upon a Time.

Personal life
Khouth was the younger brother of voice actor Sam Vincent.

Death
Khouth died on July 23, 2019, when he suffered from cardiac arrest while riding his motorcycle which caused him to crash. He was 46 years old.

Voice over roles

Live action roles

References

External links

1972 births
2019 deaths
Canadian people of Lebanese descent
Canadian male film actors
Canadian male television actors
Canadian male voice actors
Male actors from British Columbia
Motorcycle road incident deaths

20th-century Canadian male actors 
21st-century Canadian male actors